"OTW" (an acronym for "on the way") is a song recorded by American hip hop recording artist DJ Luke Nasty from his debut studio album, Highway Music: Stuck In Traffic (2016). The song was released on May 12, 2016, as the second single from the album and contains a sample of the 1990 hit song "Whatever You Want" by Tony! Toni! Toné!.

Commercial performance
The song peaked at number 71
on the US Billboard Hot 100 on January 7, 2017.

Remixes
A remix version of the song features Southern hip hop rapper 2 Chainz.

Another remix features Yung Booke, Money Man, Ace Hood, Boosie Badazz and T-Pain was released on November 21, 2016.

Charts

Certifications

References

2016 singles
2016 songs
Empire Distribution singles